Achalu may refer to:

Achalu (Kanakapura), village in India
Achalu (Ramanagaram), village in India